Hugo Constant (born 26 November 1999) is a French professional footballer who plays as a goalkeeper.

Career
On 29 May 2019, Constant signed his first professional contract with Nancy. He made his professional debut with Nancy in a 0–0 Ligue 2 tie with Sochaux on 10 April 2021.

References

External links
 

1999 births
Living people
Sportspeople from Nancy, France
French footballers
Association football goalkeepers
AS Nancy Lorraine players
Ligue 2 players
Championnat National 3 players
Footballers from Grand Est